"I Ain't Got Nobody" (sometimes referred to as "I'm So Sad and Lonely" or "I Ain't Got Nobody Much") is a popular song copyrighted in 1915. Roger A. Graham (1885–1938) wrote the lyrics, Spencer Williams composed it, and Roger Graham Music Publishing published it. It was first recorded by Marion Harris, and became a perennial standard, recorded many times over following generations, in styles ranging from pop to jazz to country music. The 2008 film Be Kind Rewind uses the version recorded by Booker T. & the M.G.'s, although two covers were recorded for the film as well: a piano solo version by Jean-Michel Bernard, and a Fats Waller-esque version by Mos Def.

Attribution 
Chicago and Saint Louis ragtime pianist and blues composer Charles Warfield (1878–1955) claimed to have originally written the song and a copyright dated April 1914 attributes Warfield as the composer, David Young as the lyricist, and Marie Lucas as the arranger. The title of the song is given as "I Ain't Got Nobody and Nobody Cares for Me". Spencer Williams' copyright entry from 1916 under a shorter title attributes the composition to Davy Peyton and himself and the lyrics to publisher Roger Graham.

In 1916, Frank K. Root & Co., a Chicago publisher (né Frank Kimball Root; 1856–1932), acquired the Craig & Co. copyright, and, later that year, also acquired the Warfield-Young copyright.

Clarence E. Brandon Sr. and Billy Smythe, both St. Louis musicians, both claim that they wrote the first version, words and music, of "I Ain't Got Nobody", filed two copyrights 1911, and published it that same year.

"Just a Gigolo/I Ain't Got Nobody" medley

"I Ain't Got Nobody" is best known in a form first recorded by Louis Prima in 1956, where it was paired in a medley with another old standard, "Just a Gigolo". Prima started pairing the songs in 1945 and the idea was revisited in the popular arrangement in a new, jive-and-jumping style, created by Sam Butera for Prima's 1950s Las Vegas stage show. The success of that act gained Prima a recording deal with Capitol Records, which aimed to capture on record the atmosphere of his shows. The first album, titled The Wildest! and released in November 1956, opened with "Just a Gigolo/I Ain't Got Nobody", which then became Prima's signature number and helped relaunch his career. Butera is noted for his raucous playing style, his off-color humor, and the innuendo in his lyrics. The arrangement he made with Prima of "Just a Gigolo/I Ain't Got Nobody" has been covered by David Lee Roth and The Village People. 

The Village People recorded a disco version of the "Just a Gigolo/I Ain't Got Nobody" medley for their 1978 album Macho Man. Although the two songs have nothing else in common, the popularity of Prima's combination, further popularized by David Lee Roth on his 1985 EP Crazy From The Heat, has led to the mistaken perception by some that the songs are two parts of a single original composition.

In 2017, the Spanish band De Morao Swing Tablao released a version of this song by double pairing it with the popular Spanish song, "María de la O".

See also
 List of pre-1920 jazz standards

References

External links
 
  - Jazzmania Quintet, with Georgie Stoll on Stroh violin, playing I Ain't Got Nobody

1915 songs
1910s jazz standards
Bessie Smith songs
Sophie Tucker songs
Songs written by Spencer Williams
Cab Calloway songs
Village People songs